Pablo Thiam (born 3 January 1974) is a Guinean former professional footballer who played as a defensive midfielder. He holds a German passport.

Club career

Born in Conakry, Thiam grew up as the son of a Guinean diplomat in the former German capital Bonn. He started his football career in MSV Bonn. At the age of 15, he went to 1. FC Köln, for whom he debuted in the Bundesliga in 1994.

After a successful spell with Stuttgart, Thiam earned a move to Bayern Munich in 2001. However, he had a hard time getting first-team football at his new club. In January 2003, he was transferred to Wolfsburg, where he ended his career and started his new job as assistant of the management of VfL Wolfsburg. In July 2009 his role was changed and he became sports director of the second team.

International career
Thiam was capped 31 times and scored one goal for the Guinean national team.

Honours
Stuttgart
 UEFA Intertoto Cup: 2000
 DFB Liga-Pokal runner-up: 1998

Bayern Munich
 Intercontinental Cup: 2001
 UEFA Super Cup runner-up: 2001

References

External links
  
 

1974 births
Living people
Guinean footballers
Guinea international footballers
1994 African Cup of Nations players
1998 African Cup of Nations players
2006 Africa Cup of Nations players
FC Bayern Munich footballers
1. FC Köln players
1. FC Köln II players
VfB Stuttgart players
VfL Wolfsburg players
Expatriate footballers in Germany
Sportspeople from Conakry
Guinean football managers
Bundesliga players
Association football midfielders